Viasat Inc. is an American communications company based in Carlsbad, California, with additional operations across the United States and worldwide. Viasat is a provider of high-speed satellite broadband services and secure networking systems covering military and commercial markets.

History
Viasat was co-founded in May 1986 by Mark Dankberg, Mark Miller and Steve Hart. Mark Dankberg became chief executive officer and Mark Miller and Steve Hart became chief technical officers. Viasat received venture capital financing of $300,000 from Southern California Ventures.  In December 1996, Viasat had its initial public offering (IPO). In 1999, Viasat moved into its headquarters in Carlsbad, California. Viasat launched a spin-off company, TrellisWare Technology, in 2000. The self-funded company focuses on developing communications and signal processing systems.

The acquisition of the satellite networking business of Scientific-Atlanta for $75 million in cash in 2000 helped Viasat to focus on providing technology for interactive services to businesses.

In 2001, Viasat started working with Boeing on Connexion broadband for airliners. The company acquired Lockheed Martin Global Telecommunications' products unit, Comsat Laboratories in 2001 for an undisclosed amount. Comsat Laboratories is Viasat's technology and product development group for communication systems focusing on developing new technologies for extremely bandwidth efficient, high data rate satellite transmission. In 2001, Viasat also purchased US Monolithics, a company focused on designing high frequency broadband circuitry, for around $30 million.

Eutelsat entered an agreement in 2001 to use Viasat's LinkStar high performance IP terminals for their broadband multimedia network over Ku-based FSS satellites. Viasat entered a joint venture in 2001 with Loral Skynet to found Immeon Networks to develop the Immeon satellite bandwidth-on-demand service sold in monthly managed service plans. ABC News used Immeon to improve its voice and data-communications for on-location news.

Viasat won a contract with WildBlue Communications worth $16 million in March 2001 to build WildBlue's satellite modems to support the company's initial service launch. WildBlue signed a second contract with Viasat in 2001 for $17 million and Viasat would develop and produce satellite modem termination systems for six gateway stations.

WildBlue launched its internet service in October 2004 after gaining Ka-band transponder capacity on the Telesat Anik F2 satellite. It conducted formal technical testing until January 2005, followed by nationwide beta testing before the first residential retail customers had services installed in June. The WildBlue service was upgraded in 2007 using the satellite WildBlue-1, which launched the year before.

In 2005, Viasat acquired Efficient Channel Coding, a producer of broadband communication integrated circuits and satellite communication systems, which gave Viasat access to the IPStar satellite broadband market. Enerdyne, a defense technology firm, was acquired by Viasat in 2006 for an initial investment of $17 million adding its EnerLinks II video data link equipment to Viasat's defense products.

Viasat acquired JAST Antenna Systems, based in Lausanne, Switzerland, in 2007.  JAST develops microwave circuits and antennas for terrestrial and mobile satellite applications.

On December 15, 2009, Viasat bought WildBlue, based in Colorado, for $568 million in cash and stock. Wildblue also brings its WildBlue-1 satellite and Ka-band capacity on Telesat's Anik F2 and about $75 million in cash and $45 million in tax losses, bringing the net purchase price to about $445 million.

In 2010, Viasat bought Stonewood Group of Dorset, England, an encryption company, for $20 million in cash and stock.

In January 2013, Viasat broke ground for its expansion in Duluth, Georgia, the second largest location after the company's headquarters in Carlsbad, California at the time. In 2015, Viasat opened a 116,000 square foot facility at the Arizona State University Research Park in Tempe, Arizona. The Arizona campus focuses on design and manufacturing of advanced microwave communication and radar products, radio frequency systems and cybersecurity. In 2016, Viasat announced a research and development facility in Chennai, India. In 2017, Viasat broke ground on an 80,000 square foot facility on the ATLAS property near the Texas A&M Health Science Center in Bryan, Texas.

Viasat also acquired LonoCloud, a company focused on cloud networking software, in 2013.

In 2014, Viasat partnered with Thuraya Telecommunications, a mobile satellite services operator, to provide machine to machine (M2M) services. The same year, Viasat entered a partnership with LightSquared to work on M2M services in vehicular and aviation devices. Viasat also teamed with Southern California Edison to provide an easy transition into operational networks. NetNearU based in Bryan/College Station, Texas was acquired in 2014. Focused on government and enterprise customers, NetNearU has a wifi management system called TRACKOS, a cloud-based software. ViaSat acquired Gray Labs, a company that specialized in satellite-to-earth communications for intelligence, surveillance and reconnaissance in July 2014.

Viasat acquired network virtualization company Engreen in 2015 to enhance its Flexible Broadband System. In March 2015, Viasat acquired EAI Design Services in order to add its Application-Specific Integrated Circuit (ASIC) and Field-Programmable Gate Array (FPGA) microprocessor design into satellite and cybersecurity projects.

In 2016, Viasat acquired Arconics, an aviation software provider based in Dublin, Ireland. The company added 40 Arconics employees to its staff and expanded its software offerings as a result of the acquisition.

In 2017, Viasat announced the intention to enter into a joint venture with the European satellite operator Eutelsat. As part of the venture, the companies will jointly operate two new business entities with one owning and operating Eutelsat's KA-SAT satellite and wholesale broadband business and the other purchasing KA-SAT satellite-based capacity and marketing retail broadband internet services throughout Europe. Both businesses would be headquartered in Lausanne, Switzerland. The companies aborted their joint venture plans in April 2018.

The company launched its third (previous satellites were ViaSat-1 and WildBlue-1) satellite, ViaSat-2 on June 1, 2017 and ViaSat-3, a high-capacity three satellite constellation, is expected to launch first satellite in 2020.

In December 2020, Viasat acquired RigNet, a secure managed networking solutions and specialized applications developer. RigNet will be incorporated into Viasat’s Global Enterprise and Mobility business unit, providing Viasat access to its digital transformation toolset, end-to-end managed communications, and connectivity service capabilities.

In May 2021, Viasat appealed to the United States Court of Appeals for the DC Circuit and requested a halt for SpaceX’s ongoing launches of low Earth orbit (LEO) satellites that power Starlink. Viasat alleged that the Federal Communications Commission's decision did not comply with the National Environmental Policy Act (NEPA) and said that SpaceX launches should be halted due to "environmental harms when satellites are taken out of orbit; light pollution that alters the night sky; [and] orbital debris." The FCC rejected these claims, and, on July 20, 2021, the judges ruled that SpaceX can keep launching broadband satellites.

On November 8, 2021, Viasat announced a $7.3 billion deal to purchase Inmarsat for $850million in cash, approximately 46million shares of Viasat stock and assumption of $3.4billion in debt.

On 24 February, 2022, the day Russia invaded Ukraine, thousands of Viasat modems got bricked by a "deliberate ... cyber event". Thousands of customers in Europe have been without internet for a month since.

On 3 October, 2022, Viasat and L3Harris announced that L3Harris would purchase Viasat's Tactical Data Link product line and network for $1.96 billion, consisting of Viasat's Link 16's terminals and networks.

Satellites
In July 2013, Viasat was licensed by the Federal Communications Commission for Ka-band aeronautical earth stations. Viasat operates resources on four satellites: ViaSat-1, WildBlue1, Anik-F2 and ViaSat-2.

Anik-F2 was launched in 2004. It entered service June 2005 (used in testing before that). Its Ka-band resources are operated by ViaSat. The satellite itself belongs to Telesat.
WildBlue-1 was launched in December 2006 from Guiana Space Centre in French Guiana. It weighed 4,735 kilograms or 10,439 pounds. WildBlue-1 became operational in early 2007.
ViaSat-1: Space Systems/Loral built ViaSat-1 and it launched from Kazakhstan in October 2011 and entered service in January 2012. ViaSat-1 covers the residential US with additional coverage in Hawaii, Canada and Alaska through a Ka-band connection. ViaSat-1 runs on fixed beams trained on certain geographic areas.
ViaSat-2 expanded the geographic range covered by ViaSat-1. Viasat partnered with Boeing to build the ViaSat-2 satellite. On July 1, 2017 ViaSat-2 was launched on an Ariane 5 rocket. The coverage area includes Mexico, Central America, the Caribbean, parts of northern South America and aeronautical and maritime routes across the Atlantic Ocean. The satellite entered service February 2018.
ViaSat-3: In November 2015, Viasat announced that it was planning to order the first of three ViaSat-3 Ka-band satellites that would expand coverage globally with throughput capacity of one terabit per second for each of the satellites. In 2017, the company said the constellation, when complete, would have more capacity than the rest of the world's spacecraft combined.
KA-SAT: In November 2020, Viasat purchased all remaining assets, including the KA-SAT, and ended its joint venture with Eutelsat. Viasat stated that it would begin prepping for ViaSat-3 Americas to launch in late 2021, followed by another ViaSat-3 covering Europe, the Middle East, and Africa in 2022.

The ViaSat-3 constellation is expected to be in service by 2022. In addition, there is a contract for a SpaceX Falcon Heavy launch for another ViaSat-3 class satellite, as well as a third satellite to be launched by United Launch Alliance within a similar timeframe.

Viasat Internet
Launched in 2012 under the Exede name, Viasat Internet is a broadband internet service that covers areas traditional terrestrial internet service providers do not reach. In 2013, the Voice home service was introduced as a companion to the data service. The company also distributes a business internet, initially called Exede Business, which was launched in 2014.

Viasat's Exede Internet is powered by Viasat's ViaSat-1 satellite. The satellite was announced in 2008. Designed by Viasat and manufactured by Space Systems/Loral in Palo Alto, California, the satellite was completed in 2011. It was launched from Baikonur Cosmodrome, Kazakhstan in October 2011 using a Proton Breeze M rocket. The satellite has a geostationary orbit over North America at 115.1° West longitude. ViaSat-1 has 72 spotbeams. The satellite has 63 beams covering the continental USA and Hawaii, and 9 covering Canada through the Xplornet service. The satellite weighs 6,740 kg and has a 15-year operational life. ViaSat-1 cost $400 million to produce and launch. ViaSat-2, which launched in June 2017, expands the capacity and coverage of the Viasat Internet service. 

Initially the satellite broadband internet was launched as a response to the lack of coverage provided by terrestrial services. The 12 Mbit/s service was faster than earlier satellite internet access options such as WildBlue which could reach 1.5 Mbit/s. In 2016, a 25 Mbit/s download speed was introduced in some areas, as well as a new modem supporting the new speed tier that includes an integrated Wi-Fi router and VoIP adapter. In 2017, Viasat sunsetted the name Exede and rebranded as Viasat Internet.

The internet service covers most of the continental U.S. and Hawaii. Between 2012 and 2015, the Federal Communications Commission has reported that Viasat's Exede Internet met or surpassed advertised speeds. In the 2015 report, download speeds were just over 100% of advertised, while upload speeds topped 150% of advertised speeds.

The long distance to the geosynchronous orbit used by Viasat has a latency of over 600 ms, over 10 times more than terrestrial or low Earth orbit systems like Starlink, rendering it much less competitive for applications like videoconferencing and video gaming.

Viasat Internet likewise offers voice over IP residential phone service with its Viasat Voice Services. DirecTV is one of the major retailers that offers Viasat Internet to its customers. Dish Network resells the Viasat Internet service and other internet services under its own DishNet brand name.

In-flight internet
In December 2013, Viasat launched its in-flight WiFi service on JetBlue. The fleet contained 190 aircraft using the service in 2014, and 420 in November 2015. The company has since expanded the service to other airlines including United Airlines, American Airlines, Scandinavian Airlines, Delta, El Al, Aeroméxico, JetBlue, and Qantas. The dual-band technology allows airlines to offer connectivity to over 150 customers at a time per plane.

International internet
In 2017, Viasat established a commercial agreement with Grupo Prosperist, a telecommunications service provider in Mexico, to deploy the Community Wi-Fi service. Community Wi-Fi utilizes a centralized hotspot in order to connect to a Viasat satellite and deliver affordable internet service to remote communities in Mexico. By 2019, Community Wi-Fi was now accessible to over one million people throughout Mexico. Facebook also began investing in Community Wi-Fi in 2019 to continue providing high-speed, satellite-powered internet to rural locations across the world.

In July 2020, Viasat launched a high-speed residential internet service for Brazil, using bandwidth from the Telebras SGDC-1 satellite. Its minimal infrastructure Wi-Fi service reached across eight states, including São Paulo, Rio de Janeiro, Minas Gerais, Pernambuco, Paraná, Rio Grande do Sul, Federal District, and Amazonas.

Security systems
Eclypt hard drives and external USB drives produced by Viasat are encrypted to ensure that data stored cannot be retrieved if a computer or storage device is stolen. Eclypt drives are used by governments, military forces, and law enforcement agencies.

Viasat Critical Infrastructure Security was introduced in 2013, designed to stop security breaches and monitor operation of grid networks using real-time intelligence. The process adds encrypted sensors to the critical national infrastructure networks and monitors all abnormal activity through a security operations center. Viasat is working in conjunction with Southern California Edison to enhance their critical infrastructure security systems through a funding from the U.S. Department of Energy meant to improve protection of the nation's electric grid and oil and gas infrastructure from cyber-attack.

Government communications
Viasat also offers mobile two-way satellite broadband services to the United States Government. Tactical communications for the US military involves tactical data, information assurance, and satellite communications. Tactical data links provide secure networking for voice and data. Information assurance for encryption devices allow for the transfer of classified data across public networks. Satellite communications give real-time intelligence for command and control functions. The US government uses ArcLight technology over a managed private network that operates on Ku-band satellite links and can use the Yonder global satellite network as well. The worldwide satellite broadband access that Viasat offers allows for airborne mobile broadband for en route communications. The company has an airborne mobility program for C-17 jets and encrypts the satellite to hub link connections for the government. Viasat's Satellite Access Manager (SAM) supports Department of Defense missions through airborne intelligence for surveillance and reconnaissance operations. SAM increases bandwidth utilization and efficiency through real-time network monitoring systems for the ArcLight2 broadband terminals.

References

Companies based in Carlsbad, California
Telecommunications companies established in 1986
American companies established in 1986
Viasat, Inc
Internet service providers of the United States
Satellite Internet access
Communications satellite operators
Companies listed on the Nasdaq
1986 establishments in California
1996 initial public offerings